Dexus is one of Australia’s leading fully integrated real asset groups, managing a high-quality Australasian real estate and infrastructure portfolio valued at $62.3 billion (pro forma post completion of the Collimate Capital acquisition).  

Dexus invests in Australia and directly owns $17.8 billion of office, industrial, healthcare and infrastructure assets and investments. The company manages a further $44.5 billion of investments in its funds management business (pro forma post completion of the Collimate Capital acquisition) which provides third party capital with exposure to quality sector specific and diversified real asset products.

The directly owned portfolio consists primarily of office properties located across the capital cities of Sydney, Melbourne, Brisbane and Perth.

Dexus is listed on the Australian Securities Exchange and is supported by more than 31,000 investors from 23 countries.

History
Dexus was listed on the Australian Securities Exchange in 1984 as the Deutsche Diversified Trust, followed by the Deutsche Industrial Trust in 1984 and the Deutsche Office Trust in 1998. In 2004, all three were stapled to form the DB Rreef Trust. In 2008 it was rebranded as the Dexus Property Group. On 27 March 2017, the company was rebranded to Dexus.

References

Companies listed on the Australian Securities Exchange
Real estate companies of Australia
Shopping center management firms
1984 establishments in Australia
Holding companies of Australia